Lee Byung-hun (born 1970) is a South Korean actor

Lee Byung-hun is a Korean name consisting of the family name Lee and the given name Byung-hun, and may also refer to:

 Lee Byung-heon (biochemist), South Korean biochemist
 Lee Byeong-heon (filmmaker) (born 1980), South Korean filmmaker
 Byung Hun (entertainer) (born 1993), South Korean actor and singer